Mohamed Sherif Ahmed is an Egyptian footballer who plays for Ismaily SC in the Egyptian League. He plays as a midfielder.  In 2013 Rabie Yassin, coach of the Egyptian national U-20 team, called him up to be a member of the Egypt Under 20 national team for the 2013 African Youth Championship in Algeria.

References 

Egyptian footballers
2013 African U-20 Championship players
Living people
1993 births
Egyptian Premier League players

Association football midfielders
Ismaily SC players